Via Dolorosa: Songs of Redemption is an Easter compilation of previously released songs by Sandi Patty in which these tracks deals with themes of the crucifixion and resurrection of Jesus Christ.

Track listings
 "Via Dolorosa" (from Songs From The Heart)
 "In The Name Of The Lord" (from Morning Like This)
 "The Day He Wore My Crown" (from Sandi's Song)
 "Where The Nails Were" (from Find It On The Wings)
 "The Old Rugged Cross" (from Hymns Just For You)
 "O Calvary's Lamb" (from Another Time...Another Place)
 "They Could Not" (from Lift Up The Lord)
 "Was It A Morning Like This" (from Morning Like This)
 "Glorious Morning" (from Songs From The Heart)
 "Who Will Call Him King Of Kings?" (from Another Time...Another Place)
 "I Will Sing The Wondrous Story" (from Artist Of My Soul)

References 

2008 compilation albums
Sandi Patty albums